Uromastyx ocellata is a species of agamid lizard native to northeastern Africa. It is known as the ocellated spinytail, eyed dabb lizard, and ocellated uromastyx.

Description
Males usually have a bright blue coloration with yellow and orange spots down their backs while females are usually lighter in coloration, but are typically larger than males.

Distribution
Uromastyx ocellata is native to northeastern Africa, where it can be found in southern Egypt, Sudan, Eritrea, Djibouti, Ethiopia (near the Somali border), and northwestern Somalia.

References

ocellata
Agamid lizards of Africa
Reptiles of North Africa
Fauna of Djibouti
Vertebrates of Egypt
Vertebrates of Eritrea
Reptiles of Ethiopia
Reptiles of Somalia
Vertebrates of Sudan
Reptiles described in 1823
Taxa named by Hinrich Lichtenstein